Doc Quixote (1970–2002) was the 1973 NCHA Non Pro Futurity Champion ridden by Paul Crumpler of Wichita Fall, TX.  He was a chestnut stallion, stood 15 hands high, and was registered American Quarter Horse #0698787.  He was the first cutting horse stallion to ever be syndicated, reportedly with shares valued at $100,000 (US).  As a sire, Doc Quixote's offspring have earned more than $10 million including four that were inducted into the NCHA Horse Hall of Fame: Poco Quixote Rio ($1,108,773), Docs Okie Quixote ($637,707) NCHA Triple Crown Champion, Cash Quixote Rio ($604,742), and Jazzote ($586,212).

Pedigree

References

American Quarter Horse racehorses
Racehorses bred in the United States
Racehorses trained in the United States
Cutting horses
American Quarter Horse sires
1970 racehorse births
2002 racehorse deaths